Staff Sergeant Lewis George Watkins (June 6, 1925 – October 7, 1952) was a United States Marine who was killed in the Korean War.

He sacrificed his life to save the lives of fellow Marines under his command and to contribute to the success of his unit's mission during the First Battle of the Hook in the Korean War. For his actions on October 7, 1952, Watkins posthumously received the Medal of Honor.

Biography
Lewis Watkins was born on June 6, 1925, in Seneca, South Carolina.  He graduated from Greenville High School, South Carolina in 1949. He was a member of the Greenville Police Department when he enlisted in the United States Marine Corps on September 12, 1950. After training at Parris Island, South Carolina.  He served at Camp Lejeune, North Carolina, and Camp Pendleton, California before being deployed to Korea.

On October 7, 1952, Sergeant Watkins' platoon was assigned to retake an outpost from the enemy. Although wounded in the fight, he placed automatic fire on the enemy machine gun position holding up the assault. When an enemy grenade landed among his men, he shoved them aside, picked up the grenade, and attempted to throw it at the enemy. The grenade exploded in his hand and wounded him mortally.

His parents, Mr. and Mrs. Fred Watkins of Seneca, South Carolina, received notification that their son had been awarded the nation's highest decoration, the Medal of Honor, in a letter from General Lemuel C. Shepherd, Jr., Commandant of the Marine Corps. The Watkins family later donated the medal to the Patriot's Hall Veterans Museum in Walhalla, South Carolina. Lewis Watkins is Oconee County's only Medal of Honor recipient.

Decorations

In addition to the Medal of Honor, Watkins decorations include: the Purple Heart; Korean Service Medal with two bronze stars; and the United Nations Service Medal.

 

National Defense Service Medal
USMC Good Conduct Medal

Medal of Honor citation
The President of the United States in the name of The Congress takes pleasure in presenting the Medal of Honor to

For conspicuous gallantry and intrepidity at the risk of his life above and beyond the call of duty while serving as a guide of a rifle platoon of Company I, in action against enemy aggressor forces during the hours of darkness on the morning of October 7, 1952. With his platoon assigned the mission of retaking an outpost which had been overrun by the enemy earlier in the night, S/Sgt. Watkins skillfully led his unit in the assault up the designated hill. Although painfully wounded when a well-entrenched hostile force at the crest of the hill engaged the platoon with intense small-arms and grenade fire, he gallantly continued to lead his men. Obtaining an automatic rifle from one of the wounded men, he assisted in pinning down an enemy machine gun holding up the assault. When an enemy grenade landed among Staff Sergeant Watkins and several other Marines while they were moving forward through a trench on the hill crest, he immediately pushed his companions aside, placed himself in a position to shield them and picked up the deadly missile in an attempt to throw it outside the trench. Mortally wounded when the grenade exploded in his hand, Staff Sergeant Watkins, by his great personal valor in the face of almost certain death, saved the lives of several of his comrades and contributed materially to the success of the mission. His extraordinary heroism, inspiring leadership, and resolute spirit of self-sacrifice reflect the highest credit upon himself and enhance the finest traditions of the U.S. Naval Service. He gallantly gave his life for his country.

See also

List of Medal of Honor recipients
List of Korean War Medal of Honor recipients

References

External links

1925 births
1952 deaths
People from Seneca, South Carolina
American military personnel killed in the Korean War
United States Marine Corps Medal of Honor recipients
United States Marines
Korean War recipients of the Medal of Honor
Deaths by hand grenade
Burials in the National Memorial Cemetery of the Pacific
United States Marine Corps personnel of the Korean War